Charles Roger Hughes (born 16 October 2003) is an English professional footballer who plays as a centre-back for Wigan Athletic.

Career
Hughes is a youth product of Manchester City and Liverpool, and moved to the youth academy of Wigan Athletic in 2017 as a U14. He was captain of their U18 side in the 2021-22 season. On 7 September 2021, he signed his first professional contract with the club. He made his professional debut with Wigan Athletic in a 1–0 EFL Trophy win over the Arsenal U21s on 25 January 2022.

Playing style
Hughes is a ball-playing centre-back. He is comfortable in possession exhibits strong leadership qualities.

References

External links
 

2003 births
Living people
English footballers
Wigan Athletic F.C. players
English Football League players
Association football defenders